Pokli is a village development committee in Okhaldhunga District in the Sagarmatha Zone of mid-eastern Nepal. At the time of the 1991 Nepal census it had a population of 2610 living in 529 individual households.

References

External links

Populated places in Okhaldhunga District